The so-called  rule of Proto-Indo-European (PIE) is a sound law of PIE accent, stating that in a word of three syllables é-o-X the accent will be moved to the penultimate, e-ó-X. It has been observed by earlier scholars, but it was only in the 1980s that it attracted enough attention to be named, probably first by Helmut Rix in 1985. Examples:

  <  "four"
 singular accusatives,
 of r-stems,  <  "sister" acc. singular
 of r-stems,  <   "hand" acc. singular
 of s-stems,  <  "Ausos" (Vedic Sanskrit )

The rule is fed by an assumed earlier sound law that changes è to ò after an accented syllable:  <  < .

The rule has been invoked by Mottausch to explain accented ó grades in the PIE nominal ablaut.

References 

G. Klingenschmitt  (1992), p. 44.
M. Kümmel,  (1996), p. 9.
K.-H. Mottausch,  HS 113 (2000).
K.-H. Mottausch,  HS 114 (2001).
H. Rix, sūdor and sīdus in: FS Knobloch (ed. Ölberg, 1985), p. 348
K. Stüber,  (2002), p. 24f.

Indo-European linguistics
Sound laws